Daniel James Martin (born 19 April 2002) is an English professional footballer who plays for Accrington Stanley as a midfielder.

Career
Martin joined the Accrington Stanley Academy at the Under 9 level, and signed his first professional contract in September 2020. In September 2021, Martin joined Northern Premier League Premier Division club South Shields on loan, where he remained for two months before joining league rivals Bamber Bridge.

On 9 August 2022, Martin was named in the starting XI for his professional debut in the EFL Cup in a 2–2 draw at home at Crown Ground against Tranmere Rovers. On 24 September 2022, Martin made his football league debut in a League One fixture coming off the bench in the 63 minute for Seamus Conneely in a 1–0 win against Bristol Rovers.

Career statistics

References

2002 births
Living people
English footballers
Accrington Stanley F.C. players
South Shields F.C. (1974) players
Bamber Bridge F.C. players
Northern Premier League players
English Football League players
Association football midfielders